Yushi is a rural town in Xinhuang Dong Autonomous County, Hunan, China. The town shares a border with Linchong Town to the west, Huangzhou Town to the east, Guizhou Province to the north, and Fuluo Town to the south.

History
During the Jiaqing period of the Qing dynasty (1644–1911), it was under the jurisdiction of Huangzhou. In the Republic of China (1912–1949), it came under the jurisdiction of the 3rd Administrative District. After the establishment of the Communist State in July 1956, the Yushi Township was set up. In September 1958, it was renamed "Yushi People's Commune". In 1984, it restored the township system. In December 1984, it was upgraded to a town.  In October 2015, some parts of the Yanjia Township were incorporated into the town.

Geography
The Wushui River winds through the town.

Economy
The local economy is primarily based upon agriculture and local industry. Tea oil and tung oil are major specialties.

Transportation
The G60 Shanghai–Kunming Expressway passes across the town northeast to southwest.

The Shanghai–Kunming high-speed railway is a high-speed railway passes across the town northeast to southwest.

References

Xinhuang